The White Towns of Andalusia, or Pueblos Blancos, are a series of whitewashed towns and large villages in the northern part of the provinces of Cádiz and Málaga in southern Spain, mostly within the Sierra de Grazalema Natural Park.

History and description 
The area has been settled since prehistoric times, and some of the local caves have ancient rock paintings. Iberian people, Roman, Visigoths and Berbers are some of the settlers before the Modern Era that left their print. It was precisely during Roman times that whitewashing was introduced, but it was later during the pandemic plague waves during 14th and later centuries when whitewashing exterior but also interior walls of houses and churches - the latter often visited by disease-affected inhabitants - became predominant. 
These villages punctuate or are close to natural parks in the south of the Iberian Peninsula, including Sierra de Grazalema Natural Park that is listed as a biosphere reserve and is the highest rainfall area in Spain, or Los Alcornocales Natural Park with its cork oak protected landscape.

All of the villages are characterised by whitewashed walls and red or brown tiled roofs. They also commonly present narrow alleyways, steep earrings, lookouts, and town squares with a church and town hall. Often local institutions manage archeological museums with Roman or Arab artifacts, as well as others dedicated to local customs, crafts or trades.

Villages and routes 

There are proposed routes to visit some of the villages. Of interest are the ones close to Ronda (province of Málaga) and Arcos de la Frontera (province of Cadiz).

Ronda's White Towns route:
 Ronda, including the ancient Roman settlement of Acinipo archeological site.
 Setenil de las Bodegas, some parts of the village use the rocky mountains as walls and roof of the houses.
 Torre Alháquime
 Olvera
 Algodonales, 16th-century town with some Roman ruins
 Zahara de la Sierra, it is in the Sierra de Grazalema Natural Park next to a reservoir.
 Grazalema
 Benaocaz, small village with a fortress

Arcos de la Frontera's White Towns route:
 Alcalá de los Gazules
 Medina Sidonia, including the Roman settlement of Asido.
 Arcos de La Frontera, perched on a cliff with Baroque churches.
 Bornos and Villamartín - reservoir, Roman ruins
 Ubrique, largest of the White Towns , high quality leather crafts among other features.
 Casares
 Jimena de la Frontera
 Castellar de la Frontera

Other villages and places to visit include:

Mijas Pueblo - Burro Taxi, Old Cathedral - typical Spanish white village
Garganta Verde and Ermita de la Garganta - caves with stalactites and stalagmites
Puerto de las Palomas - views
Villaluenga del Rosario - highest of the White Towns
Benamahoma - contains the Fuente de Nacimiento of Majaceite river
El Bosque - trout fishing and hang gliding from here
Prado del Rey - a more modern village
Puerto Serrano - a quiet town
El Gastor - Balcón de los Pueblos Blancos with a church
Alcalá del Valle - town with megalithic standing stones nearby
Algar - up a mountain road
Espera - panoramic views
Vejer de la Frontera
Frigiliana - musk wine and olive oil
Bornos
Montefrío - a top 10 National Geographic views in the world

Climate 
The climate is mild and the surrounding countryside is green. Tourist activities available include hiking, rock-climbing, pot-holing, cycling, horseback riding, nature walks and the local food.

References

Geography of Andalusia
Geography of the Province of Cádiz
Geography of the Province of Málaga
Cultural tourism in Spain